The 2009 Vaahteraliiga season was the 30th season of the highest level of American football in Finland. The regular season took place between May 30 and August 15, 2009. The Finnish champion was determined in the playoffs and at the championship game Vaahteramalja XXX the Porvoo Butchers won the Helsinki Roosters.

Standings

Playoffs

References

American football in Finland
Vaahteraliiga
Vaahteraliiga